Diego Arcay (born 10 October 1944) is a Venezuelan sports shooter. He competed in the mixed trap event at the 1984 Summer Olympics.

References

External links

1944 births
Living people
Venezuelan male sport shooters
Olympic shooters of Venezuela
Shooters at the 1984 Summer Olympics
Place of birth missing (living people)
Pan American Games medalists in shooting
Pan American Games silver medalists for Venezuela
Pan American Games bronze medalists for Venezuela
Shooters at the 1983 Pan American Games
20th-century Venezuelan people
21st-century Venezuelan people